Smurfette Jane Doe is the nickname given to an unidentified teenaged girl who was found in Houston, Texas on October 16, 2012. The decedent derived this nickname from the distinctive shirt she was discovered in. The decedent was found concealed in a black plastic garbage bag on the side of a busy road, beside a gravel road leading to an oil field. Due to advanced decomposition a cause of death could not be determined, but the effort to conceal the decedent strongly indicates homicide. Examination of the decedent's bones revealed that she had a facial asymmetry, and that she had likely been either malnourished or ill during her childhood. The decedent was interred in a anonymous grave in a Harris County cemetery.

Discovery of the body 
On 16 October 2012, a driver in Houston stopped to look for their hubcap on the side of Walters Road, near Fallbrook Church. Although this stretch of Walters Road is heavily trafficked, it has very few reasons to stop on the side of the road. The body of the decedent was discovered hidden among discarded trash, double bagged in black plastic garbage bags. The body was located near a gated gravel driveway leading to a private oil field, 20 feet from a fork in the road. The decedent was found curled up in the fetal position, and was partially skeletonized, indicating a post-mortem interval of 3 to 6 weeks, with the victim having likely died at some point in September 2012.

The decedent was determined to be a teenaged female between the ages of 15 and 17 years old. The decedent was likely mixed race, most likely African American and Caucasian. She had long curly dark brown hair, held back from her face with a standard bobby pin. Examination suggested that the decedent had hair dye in her hair at some point. The decedent was found fully clothed. She wore size 5 cargo pants, and a distinctive blue-green shirt bearing an image of the cartoon character Smurfette, with text reading "HE SMURFS ME/HE SMURFS ME NOT". However, the decedent was also found wearing adult women's lingerie, consisting of pink underpants and a black bra. The presence of these items despite her age and childish outfit has led investigators to suspect the victim was involved in sex trafficking. Additionally, the area where the decedent was found was known as a hub for brothels. A common contributing factor which makes girls vulnerable to sex trafficking is estrangement, which may be the reason why the victim has not been identified.

Investigation 
Due to advanced decomposition, a cause of death could not be determined. However, concealment efforts strongly suggest foul play. Several findings discovered during the autopsy indicate that the girl had been impoverished or in ill health prior to her death. Growth arrest lines on her bones showed arrested bone development that may have been caused by malnutrition or disease during her childhood, and she only had 22 ribs instead of the standard 24. The decedent had a very small bodily frame, and likely stood between 4'7 and 5 feet tall. The girl's skull also had a pronounced overbite, and a facial asymmetry that may have been visible during life, which was possibly caused by an illness or syndrome. The victim had received dental work previously in her life, but had heavy tooth decay at the time of her death. Dental work showed fillings on 3 lower molars. Isotope analysis indicated that the girl was not from Houston, but was instead from somewhere in South Texas, likely San Antonio or Austin. Investigators on the case have reached out to contacts in law enforcement south of the Mexico–United States border, as it is possible that the girl or her living relatives were not from the United States. Another lead that was investigated was the origin of the girl's distinctive shirt, but investigators were unable to trace it back to any retailer. Because of the victim's age, the case is being assisted by the National Center for Missing & Exploited Children. At least 17 girls have been ruled out as the victim.

See also 

 Murder of Amy Yeary
 List of murdered American children
 National Center for Missing & Exploited Children

References 

Unidentified decedents
Unidentified decedents in Texas
Unidentified American children
Murdered American children
Sex trafficking